Schoolhouse Lake Provincial Park, formerly known as Lang Lake Provincial Park, is a provincial park in British Columbia, Canada.

References

Geography of the Cariboo
Provincial parks of British Columbia
Protected areas established in 1995
1995 establishments in British Columbia